Chris Thompson (born May 9, 1994) is an American football wide receiver who is a free agent. He played college football at the University of Florida, and was signed by the Houston Texans as an undrafted free agent in 2017.

Professional career

Houston Texans
Thompson signed with the Houston Texans as an undrafted free agent on May 16, 2017. He was waived on September 2, 2017 and was signed to the Texans' practice squad the next day. He was promoted to the active roster on September 27, 2017.

On August 28, 2018, Thompson was waived by the Texans.

Orlando Apollos
In 2019, Thompson joined the Orlando Apollos of the Alliance of American Football.

San Francisco 49ers
After the AAF folded in April 2019, he signed with the San Francisco 49ers on August 3, 2019, but was waived five days later. He was re-signed on August 20, 2019. He was waived on August 31, 2019.

In October 2019, Thompson was selected by the Tampa Bay Vipers in the open phase of the 2020 XFL Draft, but did not sign with the league.

Thompson was re-signed to the 49ers' practice squad on December 3, 2019. He re-signed with the 49ers on February 5, 2020. Thompson was waived/injured on August 15, 2020, and subsequently reverted to the team's injured reserve list the next day. He was waived on March 19, 2021.

References

External links
San Francisco 49ers bio
Florida Gators bio

1994 births
Living people
Players of American football from Gainesville, Florida
American football wide receivers
Florida Gators football players
Houston Texans players
Orlando Apollos players
San Francisco 49ers players